Clementine cake is a cake flavored primarily with clementines. It may be topped with a sweet glaze or sauce, powdered sugar, honey and clementines, or candied clementines. It may originate from an orange cake in Sephardic cuisine. In popular culture, the cake played a minor part in the plot of the 2013 film The Secret Life of Walter Mitty.

Preparation and variations
Clementine cake is prepared with clementines, ground almonds or almond meal, flour, sugar, butter and eggs. Optional ingredients include orange juice, orange muscat, milk, white dessert wine, or Riesling wine, orange oil or tangerine oil (or both), almond extract and vanilla extract. Some variations exist, such as being prepared without the use of flour. It can also be prepared as an upside-down cake.

The cake can be prepared with clementines and/or clementine zest mixed in the batter, with them atop the cake, such as in slices, and in both ways. The seeds and membrane of the clementine can be removed as part of the preparation process, or seedless clementines can be used. Whole, sliced clementines including the peel, or peeled clementines can be used, and the clementines can be cooked before being used in the cake batter. The fruit can be chopped or blended using a food processor. Candied clementines can be used atop the cake or as a garnish. The almonds used can be toasted or blanched.

Clementine cake can be finished with a sweet topping such as a sugar or chocolate glaze, a fudge or chocolate sauce, powdered sugar or honey. Clementine cake may be dense and moist, and its flavor may improve a day or more after preparation, because the ingredients intermingle and coalesce to enhance its flavor as it ages. After being cooked, the cake may be delicate and can fall if it is wiggled too much.  After preparation, it can be frozen to preserve it.

History

Clementine cake is probably related to a Sephardic orange cake. Sephardic Jews popularized citrus cultivation in the Mediterranean region in the 15th century and popularized the use of orange in baked goods. In addition to its Iberian flavors, the cake also has North African and Spanish roots.

In popular culture
Clementine cake played a minor part in the plot of the 2013 film The Secret Life of Walter Mitty, and was included in the opening scene of the film and in a couple of additional scenes.

British celebrity chef Nigella Lawson has devised a recipe for clementine cake.

See also

 Fruitcake
 List of cakes
 List of desserts
 List of fruit dishes

References

Further reading

 

Cakes
Citrus dishes
Sephardi Jewish cuisine